Lac la Ronge is a glacial lake in the Canadian province of Saskatchewan. La Ronge, Air Ronge, and the Lac La Ronge First Nation are on the western shore. The lake is a popular vacation spot. Recreational activities include fishing, boating, canoeing, hiking, and camping.

Recreation and access 

Lac La Ronge Provincial Park extends around the lake on three sides, starting at La Ronge and ending along the east shore. The park contains four RV parks, two of which are on the west shore of the lake, one is in the town of Missinipe (Missinipe is the Woodland Cree name for the Churchill River which is on the south-west shore of Otter Lake, which flows through the north side of the park), and the fourth one is on the east shore of Nemeiben Lake. There is also a hunting and fishing lodge 26 km north of La Ronge. Nistowiak Falls, on the Rapid River, which is the lake's primary outflow into the Churchill River and one of the tallest falls in Saskatchewan can be observed by canoe trails on the north side of the park.

Highway 2 passes the lake on the west side, ending at La Ronge, where it becomes Highway 102. Stanley Mission can be accessed by Highway 915 on the north side of the park. The community is on the shores of the Churchill River across from the Holy Trinity Anglican Church, Saskatchewan's oldest building.

Fish species 
The lake's fish species include: walleye, sauger, yellow perch, northern pike, lake trout, lake whitefish, cisco, white sucker, longnose sucker, and burbot.

Unlike other lakes in Saskatchewan, in addition to the usual angling licence a special endorsement is required in order to fish on Lac la Ronge. The endorsement itself is free of charge and is available from the office of the Ministry of Environment in La Ronge. Beginning in 2015, the Ministry also requires anglers to keep a "Harvest Ledger," which is given alongside the endorsement. In May 2017 when the 2017-2018 fishing season opened the Saskatchewan Ministry of Environment lifted the endorsement and "Harvest Ledger" based on fish numbers in the lake rising to high numbers again.

Island ecology 
The lake's numerous islands have been the focus of biogeography studies investigating how island size and isolation influence the wildlife inhabiting them. In the northern half of the lake, you'll find over 1,300 ice age–carved granite islands.

Lac la Ronge Dam
The Lac la Ronge Dam, which is an embankment dam, was constructed at the source of the Rapid River in 1966 to regulate the lake's water level. The dam is 3.1 metres high and contains four gates. The dam was upgraded in 2007 and a fish ladder was installed.

See also
Saskatchewan Water Security Agency
List of dams and reservoirs in Canada
List of lakes in Saskatchewan

References

External links
Lac la Ronge - Encyclopedia of Saskatchewan
Lac La Ronge Provincial Park

Lakes of Saskatchewan
Hudson's Bay Company trading posts
Glacial lakes of Canada
Dams in Saskatchewan